Argentina participated in the inaugural Paralympic Games in 1960 in Rome, with a delegation consisting in five swimmers, and has taken part in every edition of the Summer Paralympics since then. The country made its Winter Paralympics début in 2010, with a two-man delegation in alpine skiing.

Argentines have won a total of 146 medals at the Paralympic Games, of which 30 gold, 59 silver and 57 bronze. All of these medals were won at the Summer Games. This places Argentina 30th on the all-time Paralympic Games medal table.

Argentines won two gold medals in swimming in 1960. In 1964, four of their six gold medals also came through swimming, the other two being obtained in athletics (women's shot put) and weightlifting. In 1968, Argentines won ten gold medals, of which nine in athletics and only one in swimming (H. Aresca in the men's 25m freestyle). These nine athletics medals were all won in javelin, shot put, club throw or discus events, and eight of them were won by women.

In 1972, the Argentine delegation was much less successful, with just one gold medal in athletics (in the men's javelin), and one in women's wheelchair basketball. In 1976, Cristina Benedetti won Argentina's only athletics gold, in the slalom, while Gustavo Galindez took two gold medals in swimming. The only time that Argentina did not win medals was in 1984. In 1992, the country's only Paralympic champion was Horacio Bascioni, in the men's javelin. In 1996, Nestor Suarez won the men's 100m sprint in the T46 category, while swimmer Betiana Basualdo won the women's 100m freestyle in the S2 category, thus providing their country with two gold medals.

Medals

Medals by Summer Games

Medals by Winter Games

Medals by Summer Sport

Medals by Winter Sport

Medalists

See also
 Argentina at the Olympics

References